Coelotrochus viridis, common name the green top shell, is a species of sea snail, a marine gastropod mollusk in the family Trochidae, the top snails.

Description
The length of the shell varies between 15 mm and 25 mm. The solid shell has a conical shape with nearly straight outlines and is false-umbilicate. The sculpture of the upper surface consists of 5 series to each whorl of rounded bead-like granules, between which are visible numerous very minute spiral striae, in the interstices of which oblique incremental striae are prominently shown under a lens. The base of the shell is concentrically striate with unequal striae that disappear toward the outer edge. The colour of the shell is dull grey, whitish, or greenish. The apex is acute. The protoconch is very small, with 1½ whorls, which have a slightly rugose surface. The about 7 whorls are nearly planulate, or sometimes a little bulging at the upper and lower margins. The body whorl is strongly angled or carinate at the periphery. The base of the shell is plano-concave. The suture is rather deep. The outer lip is convex, sharp, with a smooth marginal band inside. The outer part is narrow, white, and opaque. The inner part is broader, iridescent, and smooth. Further inside it is lirate. The basal lip is thickened, subdentate, uniting with the columella in a regular curve. The columella is oblique, with a deep fold near its insertion, and is smooth within. The umbilical area contains 3 to 4 spiral ribs. The interstices are nacreous. The umbilicus is narrow and deep or partly filled up by a white callus. The parietal wall is transversely striate or nearly smooth, with a lightbrown callus.

The animal is yellowish-brown. Its foot is reddish or purplish-brown. The filaments are white, 3 on each side. The head-lobes are smooth and rounded, and joined across the head. The eyes are on rather long white peduncles.

Distribution
This marine species is endemic to New Zealand.

References

 Powell A W B, New Zealand Mollusca, William Collins Publishers Ltd, Auckland, New Zealand 1979 
 Miller M & Batt G, Reef and Beach Life of New Zealand, William Collins (New Zealand) Ltd, Auckland, New Zealand 1973
 Marshall, B.A., 1998. A review of the Recent Trochini of New Zealand (Mollusca: Gastropoda: Trochidae). Moll. Res.1, 19:73-106

External links
 To World Register of Marine Species
 

viridis
Gastropods of New Zealand
Gastropods described in 1791